Alan Rathbone (20 October 1958 – 4 June 2016), also known by the nicknames of "Action", and "Rambo", was an English amateur boxer, and professional rugby league footballer who played in the 1970s and 1980s.

Background
Alan Rathbone was born in Warrington, Lancashire, England. He grew up in Bewsey, Warrington, and worked as a painter at K. T. Painters in Warrington, after retiring from rugby league. He suffered from arthritis in his hand, knees, and shoulders due to the injuries he had sustained while playing rugby league. He died aged 57 in Westbrook, Warrington, Cheshire, and his funeral took place at 1pm on Thursday 30 June 2016 at Walton Lea Crematorium, Walton, Warrington.

Playing career

International honours
Alan Rathbone won caps for Great Britain while at Bradford Northern in 1982 against France, and Australia, in 1983 against France (2 matches), and in 1985 against France (2 matches).

In addition to the above Test matches, Alan Rathbone played  in Great Britain's 7–8 defeat by France in the friendly at Stadio Pier Luigi Penzo, Venice on Saturday 31 July 1982.

County Cup Final appearances
Alan Rathbone played  in Bradford Northern's 5–10 defeat by Castleford in the 1981 Yorkshire County Cup Final during the 1981–82 season at Headingley Rugby Stadium, Leeds, on Saturday 3 October 1981, and played , and was sent-off for a late-tackle on Ian Potter in Warrington's 8–34 defeat by Wigan in the 1985 Lancashire County Cup Final during the 1985–86 season at Knowsley Road, St. Helens, on Sunday 13 October 1985.

John Player Special Trophy Final appearances
Alan Rathbone played as an interchange/substitute, i.e. number 15, (replacing  Kevin Tamati) in Warrington's 4–18 defeat by Wigan in 1986–87 John Player Special Trophy Final during the 1986–87 season at Central Park, Wigan on Saturday 10 January 1987.

Club career
Alan Rathbone made his début for Leigh against Castleford during September 1976. He was transferred from Leigh to Rochdale Hornets during 1978, transferred from Rochdale Hornets back to Leigh during 1979, transferred from Leigh to Bradford Northern on 16 June 1981 for £17,000 (based on increases in average earnings, this would be approximately £86,870 in 2016), and transferred from Bradford Northern to Warrington during June 1985 for £40,000 (based on increases in average earnings, this would be approximately £149,800 in 2016). He made his début for Warrington against Bradford Northern at Wilderspool Stadium, Warrington on Sunday 1 September 1985, and he played his last match, and scored a try for Warrington in the 24-12 victory over Hull Kingston Rovers at Wilderspool Stadium, Warrington on Sunday 26 April 1987. He was transferred from Warrington to Leeds during 1987 for £35,000 (based on increases in average earnings, this would be approximately £112,700 in 2016), and made his début for Leeds against Leigh at Headingley Rugby Stadium, Leeds, when he incurred a severe jaw injury in the first-half, and never played again.

References

External links
Statistics at wolvesplayers.thisiswarrington.co.uk
!Great Britain Statistics at englandrl.co.uk (statistics currently missing due to not having appeared for both Great Britain, and England)
Photograph "Peter Fox has his say - Peter fox lays down the law with Alan Rathbone and brain (sic Brian) Noble looking on - 01/01/1984" at rlhp.co.uk
Photograph "Rathbone gets weighed in - Alan Rathbone, the recent signing from Leigh is weighed in watched by his team mates. - 01/01/1981" at rlhp.co.uk
Photograph "Rathbone ragged at Widnes - Alan Rathbone is 'ragged' by the Widnes defence in the John Player Trophy third round at Naughton Park. - 19/12/1982" at rlhp.co.uk
Photograph "Rathbone goes over - Alan Rathbone breaks the tackles and goes over for a try. - 14/11/1982" at rlhp.co.uk
Photograph "Northern's Cup semi final squad 1983 - Northern's semi final squad v. Featherstone in 1983. - 26/03/1983" at rlhp.co.uk
Photograph "Alan Rathbone held - Alan Rathbone is 'collared' by the Castleford defence. - 03/10/1981" at rlhp.co.uk
Photograph "Rathbone offloads to Idle - Alan Rathbone offloads to Graham Idle. - 28/02/1982" at rlhp.co.uk
Photograph "Rathbone injured - Alan Rathbone leaves the dressing room after the games v. Widnes. -13/03/1982" at rlhp.co.uk
Photograph "Alan Redfearn signs the ball - Alan Redfearn and a group of players sign a ball. - 01/01/1983" at rlhp.co.uk
(archived by web.archive.org) Bradford sign 'Rambo'

1958 births
2016 deaths
Bradford Bulls players
English rugby league players
Great Britain national rugby league team players
Leeds Rhinos players
Leigh Leopards players
Rochdale Hornets players
Rugby league locks
Rugby league players from Warrington
Rugby league second-rows
Warrington Wolves players